Mawalgama is a village in the Colombo District, Western Province, Sri Lanka. The nearest railway station is the Kadugoda station.

References

Populated places in Western Province, Sri Lanka
Grama Niladhari divisions of Sri Lanka